The 2016–17 Kategoria e Parë was competed between 20 teams in 2 groups, A and B, respectively.

Changes from last season (2015-16)

Team changes

From Kategoria e Parë
Promoted to Kategoria Superiore:
 Luftëtari
 Korabi

Relegated to Kategoria e Dytë:
 Ada
 Butrinti

To Kategoria e Parë
Relegated from Kategoria Superiore:
 Tërbuni
 Bylis

Promoted from Kategoria e Dytë:
 Tomori
 Shënkolli
 Adriatiku

Stadia by capacity and locations

Group A

Group B

First phase

Group A

Group B

Second phase

Promotion round

Group A

Group B

Relegation round

Group A

Group B

Final

Relegation play-offs

References

2016-17
2
2016–17 in European second tier association football leagues